Andrey Vasilyevich Myagkov (8 July 1938 – 18 February 2021) was a Soviet and Russian stage and film actor, theater director and writer. He is best known for his roles in famous films directed by Eldar Ryazanov, such as The Irony of Fate (1975), Office Romance (1977), The Garage (1979) and A Cruel Romance (1984).

Biography
Andrey Myagkov was born on 8 July 1938 in Leningrad, USSR. His father, Vasily Myagkov, was a professor at Leningrad State Technical University. Young Myagkov showed interest in theater and acting and participated in a drama club at high school. Upon his graduation from high school he chose to study chemistry and attended Lensoviet Leningrad Institute of Technology, graduating in 1961 as a chemical engineer. His first job was engineer-researcher at Leningrad State Institute of Plastics. At the same time he continued to play on stage as an amateur actor.

In 1961, he entered the Nemirovich-Danchenko Moscow Art Theatre school. After graduation in 1964 Myagkov joined the Sovremennik Theatre in Moscow. There his stage partners were such notable Soviet actors as Oleg Yefremov, Yevgeny Yevstigneyev, Galina Volchek, Oleg Tabakov, Oleg Dal, Igor Kvasha, Valentin Gaft. One of his first stage plays was Uncle's dream (based on Fyodor Dostoevsky's novel of the same name) where he performed the role of the uncle.

In cinema he got his big break when director Elem Klimov offered him the lead role in the satiric film Adventures of a Dentist (1965). His next work in cinema was a role of Alyosha in critically acclaimed The Brothers Karamazov (1969) based on Dostoevsky's eponymous novel, which made him known.

In 1975, he gained fame in the enormously popular comedy-drama film The Irony of Fate as a surgeon Zhenya Lukashin. In 1977, he starred in another Ryazanov hit, Office Romance, as timid statistician Anatoly Novoseltsev, alongside Alisa Freindlich, in which he also debuted as a singer. For both roles he was awarded the USSR State Prize. In 1978 he was named Best Actor by readers of Soviet Screen.

In 1977, Myagkov left the Sovremennik Theatre and joined the Moscow Art Theatre (MKhAT), where he debuted in the leading role as Zilov in Duck Hunt by Aleksandr Vampilov, and eventually established himself as a leading actor in many other stage productions.

His other notable films are The Days of the Turbins (1976) based on Mikhail Bulgakov's novel, The Garage (1979), Vertical Race (1983), A Cruel Romance (1984).

In 1990s, Myagkov concentrated on theatrical performances and worked as a professor at the Moscow Art Theatre school. In this period he starred in the drama Mother (1990), Leonid Gaidai's comedy film Weather Is Good on Deribasovskaya, It Rains Again on Brighton Beach (1992), and the detective story Contract with Death (1998).

Myagkov played over 50 roles in film and on television. In 1989, Myagkov made his debut as director on the stage of Moscow Art Theatre with Goodnight, Mama (Spokoinoy nochi, Mama). In 2000 he directed a stageplay, Retro.

Death
Myagkov died on 18 February 2021 at home in his sleep at around 4:30 a.m.

Selected filmography
 Adventures of a Dentist (Похождения зубного врача, 1965) as Sergey Petrovich Chesnokov
 The Brothers Karamazov (Братья Карамазовы, 1969) as Alyosha Karamazov
Grandmaster (Гроссмейстер, 1972) as Sergey Aleksandrovich Khlebnikov
 The Irony of Fate (Ирония судьбы, или С лёгким паром!, 1975) as Zhenya Lukashin
 The Days of the Turbins (Дни Турбиных, 1976) as Aleksei Turbin
 Office Romance (Служебный роман, 1977) as Anatoly Novoseltsev
 The Garage (Гараж, 1979) as Khvostov
 Vertical Race (Гонки по вертикали, 1982) as Inspector Stanislav Tikhonov
 Lethargy (Летаргия, 1983) as Vadim Sergeyevich Bekasov
Epilogue (Послесловие, 1983) as Vladimir Shvyrkov
 A Cruel Romance (Жестокий романс, 1984) as Yuliy Kapitonovich Karandyshev
The Last Road (Последняя дорога, 1986) as Dubelt
 Weather Is Good on Deribasovskaya, It Rains Again on Brighton Beach (На Дерибасовской хорошая погода, или На Брайтон-Бич опять идут дожди, 1992) as "Artist", the leader of the Russian mafia / uncle Misha, immigrant
Contract with Death (Контракт со смертью, 1998) as Professor Gleb Sergeyevich Ignatovsky
 The Irony of Fate 2 (Ирония Судьбы. Продолжение, 2007) as Zhenya Lukashin

References

  Article about Andrey Myagkov by Eldar Ryazanov

External links

 Biography and filmography of Andrey Myagkov

1938 births
2021 deaths
20th-century Russian male actors
21st-century Russian male actors
Male actors from Saint Petersburg
Moscow Art Theatre School alumni
Academic staff of Moscow Art Theatre School
Saint Petersburg State Institute of Technology alumni
Honored Artists of the RSFSR
People's Artists of the RSFSR
Recipients of the Order "For Merit to the Fatherland", 3rd class
Recipients of the Order "For Merit to the Fatherland", 4th class
Recipients of the Order of Honour (Russia)
Recipients of the USSR State Prize
Recipients of the Vasilyev Brothers State Prize of the RSFSR
Detective fiction writers
Russian drama teachers
Russian male film actors
Russian male stage actors
Russian male television actors
Russian male voice actors
Russian male writers
Russian portrait painters
Russian theatre directors
Soviet drama teachers
Soviet male film actors
Soviet male stage actors
Soviet male television actors
Soviet male voice actors
Soviet male writers
Soviet painters
Soviet theatre directors
Burials in Troyekurovskoye Cemetery